The 2007 Super 14 season started in February 2007 with preseason matches held from mid-January. It finished on 19 May with the final at Kings Park Stadium in Durban, in the first final between two South African teams in the history of Super Rugby. The visiting Bulls won the 2007 Super 14 Final, scoring a try in the 83rd minute and narrowly defeating the Sharks 20–19, thereby becoming the first South African side to win the Super Rugby title in the professional era.

Super 14 is a provincial rugby union competition with 14 teams from New Zealand, Australia and South Africa. This season is the second of the expansion, which led to the name change to the Super 14. The 2007 season saw an old team emerge with a new name, as the Cats changed their name to the Lions effective 8 September 2006.

There was also some confusion over the inclusion of the Southern Spears franchise, who were in the end not included. The season is also notable of the New Zealand sides resting several All Blacks players in the first half of the season. There were 94 matches held over the 3½ months, with each team playing one full round robin against the 13 other teams, 2 semi-finals and a final. Every team will get one bye over the 14 rounds.

Player withdrawal
With the Rugby World Cup in September, all three countries would have some of their top players rested, to avoid injuries. All Blacks coach Graham Henry made clear his wish for up to 30 of New Zealand's best players to miss around half of the Super 14, with the five New Zealand franchises supporting him in May 2006. The mandatory stand-down period meant that the 30 players who toured at the end of 2006 would miss at least the first week of competition.

John Connolly, the Wallabies coach, was also interested in lightening the load for his top players. It was expected that the Australians would want to rest only a few players, especially veterans such as Stephen Larkham and George Gregan, as they are seen as key to Australia's World Cup chances. Springboks coach Jake White met the board of SA Rugby, the commercial arm of the South African Rugby Union, in Cape Town on 25 May 2006 to put forward his suggestion to rest key players between then and the World Cup at regular intervals. White was also keen to rest some players during the Boks' 2006 mid-year internationals against Scotland and France.

It was revealed in September 2006 that the All Blacks would rest 22 players, who would go into a "conditioning group" for the first 7 weeks of competition. The 22 players named were: Jerry Collins, Jason Eaton, Carl Hayman, Andrew Hore, Chris Jack, Richie McCaw, Chris Masoe, Keven Mealamu, Anton Oliver, Greg Somerville, Rodney So'oialo, Reuben Thorne, Ali Williams, Tony Woodcock, Dan Carter, Byron Kelleher, Leon MacDonald, Aaron Mauger, Mils Muliaina, Joe Rokocoko, Sitiveni Sivivatu and Piri Weepu. Seven of these players were from the Crusaders, six from the Hurricanes, four from the Blues, three from the Chiefs and two from the Highlanders. These players would be available for their franchises from Week 8. From these 22 players, Jason Eaton and Piri Weepu didn't make the final All Blacks squad for the 2007 Rugby World Cup.

After the NZRU announced the resting of 22 leading players, Pat Wilson, Australian High Performance Manager, revealed that leading Wallabies would only be rested for one match, which was to be chosen by their state's union. This decision has drawn criticism from former Wallabies coach and current Queensland Reds coach Eddie Jones, who said that while resting the older players could be beneficial, it is better for younger players, such as his own Rodney Blake, to receive game time.

The SARU decided against resting their top players for the 2007 Super 14 but conceded that it was likely that players would be rested for some games. It is expected that News Corp and the other SANZAR nations will request compensation from the New Zealand Rugby Union.

Southern Spears saga
During the 2006 Super 14 season, SA Rugby announced that, contrary to the original plans, the Southern Spears would not replace the lowest ranked South African based side.

In August 2006, however, the Spears won a court case for inclusion into the 2007 season, which would be at the expense of the Cats, who changed their name to the Lions the following month. SA Rugby and the South African Rugby Union were expected to appeal the High Court of South Africa's decision. In November 2006, SA Rugby and the Spears reached a settlement. The financially troubled Spears abandoned the court case. They will still exist as an organisation to promote and develop rugby in the Southern and Eastern Cape region, with the support of SA Rugby and the SARU, but will now not be a part of Super Rugby in the foreseeable future. With the settlement, the season's Super 14 line-up was set, with the Lions taking up the final South African place.

Table

Results
The draw for the 2007 season was released on 2006-10-13. The season started 8 days earlier than the 2006 season, with the first match being between the Blues and the Crusaders at Auckland's Eden Park, the second time in the last two years the Blues had hosted the first match. In total, 94 matches were played, comprising 91 regular season matches, 2 semi-finals and the final. There were 29 Friday night match-ups and 61 Saturday matches. One match, the Brumbies-Waratahs regional derby in Week 10, was played on a Sunday night.

Round 1
The 2007 Super 14 started in contrast to that of 2006. The game of the week was the Blues from Auckland beating the defending champions the Crusaders, which was the first loss to a New Zealand side that the Crusaders had suffered since May 2004 and was ironically the Blues' first win over a New Zealand team for two years. The other upset was 2006 Finalists the Hurricanes losing to last years 12th placed Queensland Reds.

Round 2
Week two saw the New Zealand teams have a strong week with the Hurricanes, Crusaders, Blues notching wins. Western Force began to show vast improvement from 2006 winning only their second match since entering the competition in 2006. Apart from the Force all other Australian teams suffered a loss.

Round 3
In week three a Super rugby record was broken, although not one to be proud of. The Reds and Brumbies played in the lowest scoring match ever, a dire affair that resulted in a Brumbies win 6–3. The 22 All Blacks missing from New Zealand teams started to have a visible effect on the kiwi sides with only the Hurricanes claiming a tight win over the Blues. Another relatively low scoring match saw even the last years powerhouse champions the Crusaders beaten by last years 13th placed Lions, it was the first match in six years the Crusaders hadn't scored a single try.

* Note: This match was the lowest-scoring in Super Rugby history at the time.

Round 4
Week Four saw the Brumbies lose their second game by conceding a try in the final seconds to the Hurricanes (the first was to the Blues in Week Two). The Blues convincingly put away the Queensland Reds while the Force surrendered in the final seconds to the Lions leaving them yet to win a home game. The Bulls beat the Chiefs while the Crusaders began the show the form that they have displayed in past years by beating the Cheetahs 49–28.

Round 5
Week 5 saw the Blues defeat the Highlanders, the Chiefs drew with the Cheetahs in the final moments of the game, the Hurricanes lost at | home to bottom placed Stormers and the Crusaders suffered their 3rd defeat of the season losing in the final minute because of a blunder by Rico Gear. The Brumbies also suffered a loss at | home to the Bulls whereas the controversial game of the round saw the Waratahs draw with the Western Force because of a blunder by Waratahs utility back Sam Norton-Knight who decide to run with the ball in the final minute instead of taking the penalty shot which could have won them the game and for his mistake Lote Tuqiri shoved him and walked off the pitch looking very disappointed.

Round 6
Week 6 saw the Reds travel to the "House of Pain" to play the Highlanders. Recent signing Andrew Walker was rushed into the starting team, however the Reds lost 17–33. The next game saw the Brumbies looking to rectify a three-game losing streak at their home ground. They did so with a convincing 26–13 win against the Stormers. The Force were also looking to end a | home ground hoodoo against the Hurricanes. Seeking their first ever victory at Subiaco the Force looked to have squandered an 11–10 lead upon conceding a try with two minutes left to put the score at 17–11. However a try on the sideline and followed by an unlikely conversion by Force wing Cameron Shepherd gave the Force a maiden | home victory. The next day opened with the Blues thrashing an in-form Lions outfit 41–14. The game saw Doug Howlett score two tries and in doing so becoming the equal highest try scorer in Super Rugby history (with Joe Roff of the Brumbies). The Waratahs then played a | home game against the Bulls – who won 32–19 thanks to two tries apiece to Bryan Habana and Fourie du Preez.

Note: Doug Howlett became the joint top try scorer in Super Rugby with Joe Roff on 57 Tries

Round 7
The Chiefs put on a convincing win against the Lions to start week seven. This was followed later that evening with the Force easily putting away the bottom of the table Reds in Perth. The Crusaders began to show their regular form with a win against the Bulls and the Waratahs season slumped to a new low with a home loss at the hands of the Stormers. The Cheetahs pulled off an unexpected win against the Brumbies and the undefeated Sharks continued their streak – beating the Hurricanes.

Round 8
The Waratahs fell to another loss – being convincingly beaten by the Blues in Auckland. The Bulls were not worried about the "House of Pain" moniker of Carisbrook – instead they turned in on the Highlanders to win 22–13. The Crusaders continued their quick ascent up the ladder with a bonus-point win over the Stormers. Queensland slipped to another loss – albeit a close one – against the Chiefs. The Sharks suffered their first loss of the season as the Brumbies recording a big upset at ABSA Stadium. It was also the Brumbies first ever away win against the Sharks. The Lions continued the Hurricanes bad season with an easy win.

Round 9
The Highlanders recorded a home win over the Cheetahs to open the round before the Force subjected the Sharks to their second loss in as many matches in Perth. The Hurricanes pulled off a win over the Bulls and the Blues put in a hard-fought win over the Chiefs. The Blues' Doug Howlett took sole possession of the all-| time try scoring lead in Super Rugby during the latter match. The Crusaders pulled away from the Waratahs early in the game before slacking off in the second half and seeing their lead evaporate to 34–28. The Waratahs scored a try late in the game to seemingly secure a win with the kick to come – but Peter Hewat missed a relatively easy kick to hand the Crusaders a 34–33 win. The Brumbies won a second game in South Africa – this time a close encounter against the Lions. A late Julian Huxley try securing a 14–9 win for the Canberra-based side.

Round 10
The Blues easily put away the Cheetahs in the sole Good Friday game. The next day saw the Chiefs beat the Highlanders before a startling mountain backdrop in Queenstown. The Crusaders annihilated the Force 53–0. It was the largest score ever conceded by the Force and the largest losing margin – but for the Crusaders it didn't come close to their 96–19 win against the Waratahs in 2002. The Sharks continued the high scoring – putting 57 points on the Reds in Brisbane for a big win. The Stormers upset the Lions 30–8 in Cape Town. In the sole Easter Sunday clash the Waratahs failed to resurrect their season against the Brumbies – going down 36–10 in the interstate grudge match between the rivals. The win put the Brumbies into the top four for the first time in 2007.

Round 11
This week saw the Hurricanes take on the Cheetahs and Hosea Gear became the Hurricanes' hero after scoring a 90-metre try in the final moments of the game. It was also the team's fourth try of the game which gave them a bonus point on top of the win. The following day, the Chiefs thrashed the Western Force 64–36, a game which saw a total of 14 tries being scored, nine of which were scored by the Chiefs, with Roy Kinikinilau and Brendon Leonard each getting hat-tricks. The Crusaders then defeated the Highlanders to climb to the top of the table. The Blues lost to the Sharks at home, going down by 7 points, and the Waratahs won only their second game this season, defeating the Reds, who sit at the bottom of the table. In the last match of the week, the Bulls thrashed the Stormers 49–12.

Round 12
The Crusaders defeated the Hurricanes in a thrilling encounter which saw Jerry Collins being stretchered off after injuring his neck in a tackle on Rua Tipoki. The Brumbies defeated the Western Force in an all-Australian derby by just two points and the Reds won their second game of the season defeating the Cheetahs. Ben Tune (who is leaving the club after the season) scored the winning try in that match, but the match of the round saw the Chiefs defeat the Sharks to put themselves in contention for a semi-final spot. The Waratahs lost to the Highlanders by a point after Peter Hewat missed another conversion, and in a South African derby, the Bulls thrashed the Lions 31–7. Finally, the Blues lost their away match to the Stormers, but they remain second in the table nonetheless.

Round 13
With the semi final week just around the corner, Week 13 saw some close matches including the opener between the Highlanders and the Hurricanes at the cake tin. The score was 22 – 16 to the Hurricanes at 80 minutes but a final minute try to Toby Morland in the corner turned things around. Nick Evans needed to get the kick over to win the game but was unsuccessful allowing the Hurricanes to win the game lucky to not have the same situation when the Hurricanes lost to the Force in week 6. The force continued their up and down season by comfortably beating the cheetahs. The Waratahs narrowly lost going down to the chiefs. The Brumbies pulled an upset win over the Crusaders to keep their semi final hopes alive. The Sharks dominated the lions to make sure they would at least get a home semi final. The Blues lost their third game in a row going down to the Bulls which slimmed the chances of the Blues securing a semi final spot and helped the Bulls secure a semi final spot. The last game of the week saw the stormers easily put away the Reds.

Round 14
This was an exciting week for the two South African contenders the Bulls and the Sharks, both with possibilities of a home semi final. The action-packed weekend started with an upset, the in-form Chiefs beating the Crusaders 30–24 at Lancaster Park. This result gave the Sharks the opportunity to take the top spot if they won in Cape Town. The Blues smashed the Western Force 33–6 to keep their title dreams alive. Later, the Brumbies kept their semi final hopes alive by defeating the tired and weary Highlanders 29–10. Waratahs defeated the Hurricanes away in Wellington 38–14. Cheetahs gave the Lions the South African wooden spoon by beating them 16–10. The first main game of the day was the Stormers vs the Sharks. The Sharks played an efficient and professional game whilst the Stormers played their usual erratic hot and cold game that had seen them beat some good teams during the season, but in the end the Sharks easily claimed a 36–10 victory to be the first South African side to finish at the top of the table at the end of the round-robin stage in the Super 14 competition's history. The last game of the weekend promised to be a huge one for the Bulls, who were chasing a semi final spot. They came up against a feeble Reds team, who after going ahead 3–0 in the beginning, had no idea of the onslaught they were going to receive. The Bulls, who needed a bonus-point win to reach the semifinals, easily achieved this goal a quarter of the way into the "match". Early in the second half they reached the 45-point margin needed to push them up to third place. Then the impossible became possible. If the Bulls went 72 points clear of the Reds, they would leapfrog to second, giving them a home semifinal in the high-altitude cauldron of noise that is Loftus Versfeld. They seemed to reach this goal with little effort against a humiliated Reds side, setting a new Super Rugby record for winning margin of 89 points.

Finals

Semi finals

Grand final

The match had four tries – two by each team, and the last of which was scored by Bulls' wing Bryan Habana in the 82nd minute to give his team the trophy. It was the first Super rugby final to be played in South Africa, as well as the first all South African final, and the first final with a South African winner.

Man of the Match:Victor Matfield (Bulls)
Assistant referees:Lyndon Bray (New Zealand)Bryce Lawrence (New Zealand)
Television match official:Kelvin Deaker (New Zealand)
Assessor: Tappe Henning (South Africa)

Player statistics

Leading try scorers

Leading point scorers

References

 
2007
 
 
 
2007 rugby union tournaments for clubs